Xiqu Subdistrict is a subdistrict in Gujiao, Taiyuan, Shanxi province, China. , it has six residential neighborhoods and two villages under its administration:
Neighborhoods
Xiqu Community
Fanshigou Community
Yingbin Road Community
Binhebei Road Community
Tanshang Community
Shitanju Community

Villages
Gangli Village
Yongshuqu Village

See also 
 List of township-level divisions of Shanxi

References 

Township-level divisions of Shanxi
Gujiao